Sugarshock! was an online comic written by Joss Whedon and illustrated by Fábio Moon. It was hosted on Myspace as part of Dark Horse Presents.  It won a 2008 Eisner Award for Best Digital Comic.

The comic is about a struggling rock band that goes on zany, sci-fi oriented adventures.  The tone of the comic is light and humorous.  The band is anchored by a spunky, red-haired Asian girl named Dandelion who really hates Vikings (despite probably being one) and engages in nonsensical discussions that sometimes turn out to be true.

Issue 1:Sugarshock!: Battle Royal With Cheese
Issue 1 starts off with unnamed band singing a song that incorporates the "I'm rubber, you're glue, everything you say bounces off of me and sticks to you" mantra. Dandelion is singing, a robot and L'Lihdra playing guitar, and Wade playing drums. After an unspecified period of time, Dandelion anxiously wait backstage to hear the winners of "the South Fairville Hormer's Shrimp 'N' Taco Rock-Off", which they hope to win, but they lose to a solo act by the name of "Sensitive Guy", whom Dandelion thinks "was great". On the ride home, Dandelion cries and asks rhetorically "...Why do we fail...?" despite being comforted by their groupie (who is later revealed to be a mechanic), "I thought you guys kicked ass.", whom Wade, the band's drummer, is planning to use for sex. Wade silences him, saying "You remember you're not allowed to talk until after I've used you for sex, right?". L'Lihdra then calmly blames Dandelion for their defeat, saying that she was "offkey on the chorus of 'God bites Man.' In this way, we were denied the victory", much to the shock of everyone in the car and to the anger of Dandelion. Dandelion accuses L'Lihdra of calling her a Viking. This starts a heated argument that is cut short when an unknown object(s) lands on the roof of the car with much force.

References

External links
direct link to Sugarshock! on Myspace
Collected in trade paperback
Review of Sugarshock! at Comixtalk

2000s webcomics
Dark Horse Comics titles
Science fiction webcomics
Eisner Award winners
Comics by Joss Whedon
2007 webcomic debuts